Gregg Allan Wallace  (born 17 October 1964) is an English broadcaster, entrepreneur, media personality, writer and former greengrocer. He is known for co-presenting MasterChef, Celebrity MasterChef and MasterChef: The Professionals, alongside celebrity chef John Torode, on BBC One and BBC Two. He has jokingly referred to himself as "just the fat, bald bloke on MasterChef who likes pudding". He has written regularly for Good Food, Now and Olive magazines.

Early life and business career 
Gregg Allan Wallace was born on 17 October 1964 in Peckham, South London. At the age of eight, he was a victim of sexual abuse. He left school at 15 and started work as a warehouseman at Covent Garden Fruit and Veg Market. He sold vegetables at a stand in Covent Garden, before becoming a salesman. He was later told that setting up a business might be a good idea. In 1989, he started George Allan's Greengrocers, a company that built up to an eventual turnover of £7.5 million. In 2010, Wallace opened the restaurant Wallace & Co in the London district of Putney, where he served as one of the directors. 

In 2012, he opened Gregg's Bar & Grill in a joint venture with the Bermondsey Square Hotel in Bermondsey Square. In August 2013, it was reported that one of Wallace's companies, West Veg Limited, had folded, owing more than £500,000. In 2014, both of his restaurants folded, with Wallace & Co owing suppliers £150,000.

Television career 
Wallace was invited to co-present Veg Talk on BBC Radio 4 with Charlie Hicks. The programme aired for seven years. 

Wallace was the original presenter of Saturday Kitchen from 2002 until being replaced by Antony Worrall Thompson in 2003. Wallace also presented Veg Out for the Discovery Channel, and Follow That Tomato for The Food Channel, resulting in a Royal Television Society award for Best Lifestyle Programme in 2003. 

In 2008 and 2009, Wallace presented two editions of The Money Programme on the effect that the financial crisis was having on the public's attitudes towards food. In August 2013, Wallace presented Supermarket Secrets, a BBC One programme about supermarket food sourcing and distribution, and in September 2013, he co-presented Harvest 2013, a three-part documentary following the progress of Britain's vegetable, cereal and fruit harvests. 

In 2013, Wallace started to co-present Eat Well for Less? alongside Chris Bavin for BBC One and since 5 May 2015 he has co-presented Inside the Factory, alongside Cherry Healey and Ruth Goodman for BBC Two.

In 2016, Wallace was the presenter of a revived series of the BBC historical game show Time Commanders, appearing alongside the likes of historians Mike Loades and Dr Lynette Nusbacher. 

In December 2019, Wallace presented a Channel 5 documentary called Gregg Wallace's Magical Christmas Market, filmed in Vienna, Austria. In April 2020, Channel 5 scheduled a follow-up series to his Magical Christmas Market called Gregg Wallace's Fun Weekends, but it was pulled because it featured cities badly impacted by the COVID-19 pandemic.
 The four-part travel series was finally transmitted in February 2021 as Big Weekends with Gregg Wallace (also known as Gregg Wallace: Big Weekends Away) with the first episode being about Barcelona.

Also in February 2021, Wallace presented a six-part ITV series called South Africa with Gregg Wallace. In the series, he experienced some of the country's most iconic landscapes and experiences, seeing Isandlwana, the Augrabies Falls, Durban and the Orange River.

In this month it was reported that Kimberly Walsh from Girls Aloud was likely to replace Wallace as presenter of Eat Well For Less, after Wallace left the show after eight years.  

In December 2021, Wallace presented two Channel 5 Christmas specials: Gregg Wallace's Grand Christmas Adventure and Gregg Wallace's Magical Christmas Market.

MasterChef
Since 2005, Wallace has been co-presenter and judge of BBC cooking show MasterChef, with John Torode. On the show, Wallace is known for his dramatic presenting style, characterised by shouted delivery and impassioned facial expressions.

He was the main voice in the 2013 YouTube viral video "Buttery Biscuit Base", formally known as "MasterChef Synesthesia", in which his voice was taken from a number of episodes of MasterChef and used to create a song. Since its upload, the original video by Swedemason has garnered over 10 million views.

In March 2018, Wallace refused to judge Zaleha Kadir Olpin's dish on MasterChef, claiming that the stewed chicken rendang dish was "not crispy enough and could not be eaten". This remark caused a significant media and public backlash in some prominent members of the ASEAN countries such as Malaysia, Indonesia, Singapore and Brunei, who claimed that rendang is a "stewed, soft and tender dish: not intended to be crispy".

Guest appearances 
In 2007, Wallace appeared in the BBC singing contest Just the Two of Us where he partnered with professional singer Carol Decker. The duo were the first to be eliminated.

In 2010, Wallace appeared in the BBC One series Turn Back Time: The High Street with Tom Herbert and Juliet Gardiner.

On 27 January 2012, he appeared in an episode of Room 101 on BBC One.

In August 2012, Wallace was the subject of an edition of the BBC One's Who Do You Think You Are? celebrity genealogical programme.

In 2014, Wallace appeared as a guest panellist on the BBC Two programme An Extra Slice.

In 2017, Wallace appeared as a contestant in Series 7 of the ITV quiz show The Chase Celebrity Special.

In 2019, Wallace appeared as a contestant on Celebrity Catchphrase.

In 2021, Wallace appeared as a contestant on the third series of The Chase spin off, Beat the Chasers.

In 2021, Wallace appeared as a celebrity expert on the Christmas special of The Wheel.

Strictly Come Dancing 

In September 2014 Wallace was a contestant on the twelfth series of BBC's Strictly Come Dancing, partnered with professional Aliona Vilani. In the first week Wallace danced a Cha-cha-cha to Katy Perry's "Hot n Cold". During the judges' comments, Wallace joked about the lack of success shown by Craig Revel Horwood in a previous series of Celebrity Masterchef. He left the show in the second week, after the first public vote, when the Waltz danced by Jennifer Gibney and Tristan MacManus was preferred by the judges to Vilani and Wallace's Charleston.

Personal life 
Wallace has been married four times and divorced three times.  His first wife Christine left him after just six weeks of marriage in 1991. Wallace has two children (Tom and Libby) from his second marriage to Denise, a former pastry chef, in 1999. The couple separated in 2004 and Wallace won full custody of their children. Wallace met his third wife Heidi in 2009 and the couple married in 2010. They separated after 15 months of marriage, and later divorced.

Wallace met Anne-Marie Sterpini, 21 years his junior, on Twitter in 2013 and they married in August 2016. Masterchef co-host John Torode served as best man at the wedding at Hever Castle, Kent. Sterpini gave birth to their first child, Sid, in May 2019. Wallace publicly expressed his fears of being an "old parent" but said that he was considering having more children.

In 2013 Wallace underwent a weight loss programme after being told that his cholesterol level was dangerously high and that he risked a heart attack. Wallace lost .

Wallace was appointed Member of the Order of the British Empire (MBE) in the 2022 Birthday Honours for services to food and charity.

Bibliography 

 Veg: The Greengrocer's Cookbook. Mitchell Beazley. 2006. 
 A Cook's Year: How to Choose and Cook with Great Ingredients. Mitchell Beazley. 2008. 
 Veg: The Cookbook. Octopus Publishing Group. 2009. 
 Gregg's Favourite Puddings. Octopus Publishing Group. 2010. 
 Great British Food Revival: The Revolution Continues: 16 Celebrated Chefs Create Mouth-watering Recipes with the UK's Finest Ingredients. Orion Publishing Group. 2011. 
 Life on a Plate: The Autobiography. Orion Publishing Group. 2012. 
 Gregg's Italian Family Cookbook. Octopus Books. 2019.

References

External links 
 
 
 

1964 births
Living people
People from Peckham
English television personalities
English writers
English television presenters
English businesspeople
Smithsonian Channel
Members of the Order of the British Empire